A&G  is a management consulting Italian company based in Turin. It nationally and internationally operates in the fields of Manufacturing and Services, Finance, Banking and Insurance.

Through the group's company  A&G acts in new economy and e-business. Through its partnership with the Russian start-up Intelligent Ideas  A&G expands its range of activities in the Russian and international markets.

A&G also works in the field of Culture, financing Italian and foreign film works.

References

External links
A&G official web site
A&G on Facebook

Companies based in Piedmont
Companies based in Turin
Management consulting firms of Italy
Consulting firms established in 1988
Companies established in 1988
Italian companies established in 1988